The 1999 Calder Cup playoffs of the American Hockey League began on April 21, 1999. The sixteen teams that qualified, eight from each conference, played best-of-five series for division semifinals and best-of-seven series for division finals and conference finals.  The conference champions played a best-of-seven series for the Calder Cup. The Calder Cup Final ended on June 13, 1999, with the Providence Bruins defeating the Rochester Americans four games to one to win the first Calder Cup in team history. Providence's Peter Ferraro won the Jack A. Butterfield Trophy as AHL playoff MVP.

Playoff seeds
After the 1998–99 AHL regular season, 16 teams qualified for the playoffs. The top four teams from each division qualified for the playoffs. However, due to the uneven number of teams in the Western Conference, it was possible for the fifth-placed team in the Empire Division to crossover to the Mid-Atlantic Division. This could only happen if the fifth-placed team in the Empire Division earned more points than the fourth-placed team in the Mid-Atlantic Division. In this case, the fifth-placed team from the Empire Division would play in place of the fourth-placed team from the Mid-Atlantic Division in that part of the playoff bracket. The Providence Bruins were the Eastern Conference regular season champions as well as the Macgregor Kilpatrick Trophy winners with the best overall regular season record. The Rochester Americans were the Western Conference regular season champions.

Eastern Conference

Atlantic Division
 Lowell Lock Monsters – 81 points
 St. John's Maple Leafs – 79 points
 Fredericton Canadiens – 77 points
 Saint John Flames – 71 points

New England Division
 Providence Bruins – Eastern Conference regular season champions; Macgregor Kilpatrick Trophy winners, 120 points
 Hartford Wolf Pack – 87 points
 Springfield Falcons – 80 points
 Worcester IceCats – 78 points

Western Conference

Empire Division
 Rochester Americans – Western Conference regular season champions, 111 points
 Albany River Rats – 100 points
 Hamilton Bulldogs – 91 points
 Adirondack Red Wings – 53 points

Mid-Atlantic Division
 Philadelphia Phantoms – 105 points
 Kentucky Thoroughblades – 98 points
 Hershey Bears – 85 points
 Cincinnati Mighty Ducks – 76 points

Bracket

In each round the team that earned more points during the regular season receives home ice advantage, meaning they receive the "extra" game on home-ice if the series reaches the maximum number of games. There is no set series format due to arena scheduling conflicts and travel considerations.

Division Semifinals
Note 1: All times are in Eastern Time (UTC−4).
Note 2: Game times in italics signify games to be played only if necessary.
Note 3: Home team is listed first.

Eastern Conference

Atlantic Division

(A1) Lowell Lock Monsters vs. (A4) Saint John Flames

(A2) St. John's Maple Leafs vs. (A3) Fredericton Canadiens

New England Division

(N1) Providence Bruins vs. (N4) Worcester IceCats

(N2) Hartford Wolf Pack vs. (N3) Springfield Falcons

Western Conference

Empire Division

(E1) Rochester Americans vs. (E4) Adirondack Red Wings

(E2) Albany River Rats vs. (E3) Hamilton Bulldogs

Mid-Atlantic Division

(M1) Philadelphia Phantoms vs. (M4) Cincinnati Mighty Ducks

(M2) Kentucky Thoroughblades vs. (M3) Hershey Bears

Division Finals

Eastern Conference

Atlantic Division

(A3) Fredericton Canadiens vs. (A4) Saint John Flames

New England Division

(N1) Providence Bruins vs. (N2) Hartford Wolf Pack

Western Conference

Empire Division

(E1) Rochester Americans vs. (E3) Hamilton Bulldogs

Mid-Atlantic Division

(M1) Philadelphia Phantoms vs. (M2) Kentucky Thoroughblades

Conference finals

Eastern Conference

(N1) Providence Bruins vs. (A3) Fredericton Canadiens

Western Conference

(E1) Rochester Americans vs. (M1) Philadelphia Phantoms

Calder Cup Final

(N1) Providence Bruins vs. (E1) Rochester Americans

See also
 1998–99 AHL season
 List of AHL seasons

References

Calder Cup
Calder Cup playoffs